This is a list of medalists at the 1996 Summer Olympics in Atlanta, USA:
{| id="toc" class="toc" summary="Contents"
|align="center" colspan=3|Contents'''
|-
|
Aquatics
Archery
Athletics
Badminton
Baseball
Basketball
Boxing
Canoeing
Cycling
Equestrian
|valign=top|
Fencing
Field hockey
Football
Gymnastics
Handball
Judo
Modern pentathlon
Rowing
Sailing
Shooting
|valign=top|
Softball
Table tennis
Tennis
Volleyball
Weightlifting
Wrestling
|-
|align=center colspan=3| Leading medal winners               References        
|}



Aquatics

Diving

Swimming

* Swimmers who participated in the heats only and received medals.

Synchronized swimming

Water polo

Archery

Athletics

Track

* Athletes who participated in the heats only and received medals.

Road

Field

Baseball

Badminton

Basketball

Boxing

Canoeing

Slalom

Sprint

Cycling

Road

Track

Mountain bike

Equestrian

Fencing

Field hockey

Football

Gymnastics

Artistic

Rhythmic

Handball

Judo

Modern pentathlon

Rowing

Sailing

Shooting

Softball

Table tennis

Tennis

Volleyball

Beach

Indoor

Weightlifting

Wrestling

Freestyle

Greco-Roman

Leading medal winners
23 competitors won at least three medals.

See also
 1996 Summer Olympics medal table

References

External links

Medalists
Lists of Summer Olympic medalists by year
Georgia (U.S. state) sports-related lists